The 1954 New Zealand bravery awards were announced via a special honours list on 29 January 1954, and recognised four people for acts of bravery in the aftermath of the Tangiwai disaster on 24 December 1953.

George Medal (GM)
 Arthur Cyril Ellis – postmaster, Taihape.
 John Warren Holman – of South Beach, Plimmerton.

British Empire Medal (BEM)
Civil division
 Arthur Dewar Bell – of Raetihi.
 William Ian Inglis – railway guard, of Ngaio, Wellington.

References

Bravery
Bravery awards
New Zealand bravery awards